Luke Davies (born 1962) is an Australian poet.

Luke Davies may also refer to:

Luke Davies (rugby union) (born 2001), Welsh rugby union footballer
Luke Davies-Uniacke (born 1999), Australian rules footballer